Bill Kimball, Billy Kimball, or William Kimball may refer to:

 William P. Kimball (1857–1926), U.S. Representative from Kentucky
 William Wallace Kimball (1828–1904), Iowa real estate broker and Chicago piano manufacturer
 William Wirt Kimball (1848–1930), U.S. naval officer
 William Henry Kimball (1826–1907), Mormon pioneer
 Bill Kimball (1908–1962), politician
 Billy Kimball (born 1959), writer and producer